Colleen Doran is an American writer-artist and cartoonist. She illustrated hundreds of comics, graphic novels, books and magazines, including the autobiographical graphic novel of Marvel Comics editor and writer Stan Lee entitled Amazing Fantastic Incredible Stan Lee, which became a New York Times bestseller. She adapted and did the art for the short story "Troll Bridge" by Neil Gaiman, which also became a New York Times bestseller. Her books have received Eisner, Harvey, Bram Stoker, and International Horror Guild Awards.

Her 2019 graphic novel adaptation of Neil Gaiman's short story Snow, Glass, Apples, won the Bram Stoker Award for Superior Achievement in a Graphic Novel. It won the 2020 Eisner Award for Best Adaptation from Another Medium, and Colleen Doran was also nominated for the Eisner for Best Penciller/Inker. Neil Gaiman's Snow, Glass, Apples was also nominated for the Reuben Award from the National Cartoonists Society for Best Graphic Novel. It won the 2020 Ringo Award for Best Graphic Novel with Doran nominated for Best Artist. It received an Honorable Mention at the Rondo Classic Horror Awards for Best Comic.

She also illustrated the works of Alan Moore, Warren Ellis, Joe R. Lansdale, Anne Rice, J. Michael Straczynski, Peter David and Tori Amos.

Notable credits include: The Sandman, Wonder Woman, Legion of Superheroes, Teen Titans, The Vampire Diaries comics, Walt Disney's Beauty and the Beast, and her space opera series, A Distant Soil.

Early work
At age five, Doran won an art contest sponsored by the Walt Disney Company. Doran created her comic book series, A Distant Soil, at age twelve.

Doran landed her first work for an advertising agency at age fifteen. She attended Christopher Newport University for one year and the Art Institute of Pittsburgh online for one semester and used her professional works for curriculum credit. Science fiction artist Frank Kelly Freas was her mentor, and she apprenticed with him in the early 1980s.

She broke into the comic book industry when still a teenager, scouted by Tom Long for his fanzine Graphic Showcase. Long hired Doran to draw a revival of the 1940s character Miss Fury. Underage Doran quit the assignment due to its adult content. She also contributed illustrations to the Hugo Award nominated fanzine Lan's Lantern.

A Distant Soil was published in fanzines as early as 1979, then scouted by The Donning Company Starblaze imprint before it was contracted by WaRP Graphics. Doran left the company after nine issues due to an acrimonious dispute with WaRP, which attempted to claim copyright and trademark on her work. The WaRP version of the story has never been reprinted despite its unusual all-pencil style, and Doran's ownership of the publishing rights.

Career
Doran discarded the 300 pages of work she did at Warp, and rewrote and redrew the entire A Distant Soil story from scratch, first with Donning, then as a self-publisher. A 1000-page long-form comics narrative, it has been published by Image Comics since 1996.  It sold more than 700,000 copies in multiple printings. The production archives were destroyed by the printer, and an extensive restoration process brought the series back to publication in 2013.

Doran was scouted by Keith Giffen to work at DC Comics after he saw her work in the Legion of Superheroes fanzine Interlac. They went on to become frequent collaborators at DC on The Legion of Superheroes projects, Justice League 3001, and the series Reign of the Zodiac. Her art also appeared in Amethyst, Princess of Gemworld No. 12, multiple issues of Who's Who in the DC Universe and Who's Who in the Legion of Superheroes, Superman: Man of Steel Gallery, Christmas with the DC Superheroes, Captain Atom, Star Trek, and Hawkman Annual. She did art for several Teen Titans and Wonder Woman projects.

She illustrated portions of the "Dream Country" and "A Game of You" story arcs in Neil Gaiman's The Sandman series. The character Thessaly in Neil Gaiman's Sandman is based on Doran. Other Vertigo appearances include Shade, The Changing Man, Lucifer (DC Comics), Transmetropolitan and the original graphic novel Orbiter (comics) written by Warren Ellis.

Doran's premiere at Marvel Comics was in 1986, Swords of the Swashbucklers No. 9 and 11, with issue 11 having the dubious distinction of being one of the books confiscated in the 1986 Friendly Franks "obscene" comics raid that precipitated the formation of the Comic Book Legal Defense Fund. Swords of the Swashbucklers was eventually excluded from the prosecution proceedings.

Doran worked on other projects at Marvel including The Guardians of the Galaxy Annual No. 3, The Silver Surfer, Marvel Fanfare, Excalibur No. 28, Captain America: Drug Wars, Amazing Spider-Man, Friendly Neighborhood Spider-Man, a Power Pack mini-series, Handbook of the Marvel Universe, Mutant X, X-Factor, Marvel Girl Comics, and X-Men Millennial Visions for which she wrote and drew an entry. She also worked in the Special Projects Department on promotional, educational, and greeting card art, sometimes working directly with Stan Lee.

At Marvel Comics' Epic division, she worked on Clive Barker's Nightbreed No. 21 and No. 22 as interior and cover artist, and Clive Barker's Hellraiser No. 5 and No. 14, as artist and colorist.

Doran was a web columnist for Wizard Magazine in the early 1990s, and illustrated Super Idol for Warren Ellis in 2001, an early webcomics format experiment at Artbomb.

Doran is featured in the films Ringers (a documentary about The Lord of the Rings fans), Scenes From the Small Press: Colleen Doran by Rich Henn, Sex, Lies and Superheroes, the documentary The Cartoonist about Bone creator Jeff Smith, and Captured Ghosts, a documentary about writer Warren Ellis. She was also featured in the December 12, 2011 episode of "Stalked: Someone's Watching," a Discovery ID television series that profiles stalking incidents, focusing on interviews with victims.

Doran worked as a creator rights activist and as a lobbyist in Washington D.C., and served on the advocacy committee of the Graphic Artists Guild. Lecture venues include the Smithsonian Institution, The Singapore Writers Festival, the Comics Masterclass in Sydney, Australia, and the Maryland Institute College of Art. She spoke at CREATE: Protecting Creativity from  the Ground Up at the Newseum in Washington DC, with Congresswoman Marsha Blackburn, Rick Carnes President of the Songwriters Guild of America, musician Suzanne Vega, and other artists and technology policy specialists.

2010s
Doran illustrated young adult novelist Barry Lyga's first graphic novel for Houghton Mifflin, Mangaman in 2011.

Gone to Amerikay, a graphic novel drawn by Doran and written by Derek McCulloch, was released in 2012 from DC/Vertigo. It is a "multi-generational Irish saga." Gone to Amerikay themed cover art was featured in the St. Patrick's Day edition of the Irish Echo, which was then presented to President Barack Obama by Deputy First Minister Martin McGuinness of Northern Ireland. An excerpt from Gone to Amerikay was chosen for inclusion in The Best American Comics 2013.

Doran produced cover art for The Walking Dead No. 1 (2015, Image Comics), Red Sonja (Dynamite, 2014), Marvel's S.H.I.E.L.D. No. 4 (2015), and Squirrel Girl No. 7 (2016). For DC Comics, she wrote and drew stories for The Vampire Diaries (2014), based on the TV show, and art for Justice League 3001 No. 6, 9 and 10 (2015–2016). For IDW's Womanthology (2012), she contributed biographical essays about classic cartoonists Rose O'Neill and Ethel Hays.

In 2015, she illustrated the autobiography Amazing Fantastic Incredible Stan Lee, co-written by Lee and Peter David.

With Alan Moore, she did the art for Big Nemo, a dystopian sequel to Winsor McCay's Little Nemo in Slumberland, as a webcomic for the Electricomics app.

She did the art for an adaptation of Neil Gaiman's short story "Troll Bridge" as a graphic novel for Dark Horse, released in October 2016. She also worked on issues of Faith and X-O Manowar for Valiant Comics. She produced work for the adaptation of Neil Gaiman's American Gods. She was the artist for the series Finality with Warren Ellis at Line Webtoon.

In 2019, Dark Horse Comics published Doran's adaptation of Neil Gaiman's "Snow, Glass, Apples" which was described by The Comics Journal as a work which "...solidifies her place as one of the greatest cartoonists of her generation." The Horror Writers Association presented "Snow, Glass, Apples" with the Bram Stoker Superior Achievement in a Graphic Novel award for 2019. It also won the Eisner Award for Best Adaptation from Another Medium, and the Ringo Award for Best Graphic Novel.

2020s
In 2020, For "Wonder Woman 750" Doran and Gail Simone teamed up for a story featuring their "breakout" character Star-Blossom, whose first appearance was the Wonder Woman 75th Anniversary Special in 2016. Doran wrote and illustrated a short story for "Sensational Wonder Woman", and illustrated another Wonder Woman short story for "Wonder Woman Black: and Gold" in 2021. She also produced work for DC Comics' "Generations: Forged"  and cover art for "Batman: Urban Legends".

In 2021 Doran produced art for the Z2 Comics graphic novel anthology The Doors: Morrison Hotel, an official graphic novel collection based on the music of the band The Doors. Her work was also used for limited edition prints and the bookplate.

Doran wrote and illustrated work for Balmain: Dreams 10 OR a graphic novel dedicated to the French fashion house Balmain in celebration of the 10 year anniversary of creative director Olivier Rousteing.

In 2022, Z2 Comics contracted Doran to produce work for officially licensed graphic novels for Blondie (band), Melissa Etheridge, and the 30th Anniversary of the Tori Amos album Little Earthquakes.

Forbes Magazine announced another Neil Gaiman/Doran collaboration for the adaptation of the Gaiman prose short story "Chivalry" from Dark Horse Comics. Released in March 2022, Doran hand-painted the work in watercolor, ink, and 18K gold after studying illuminated manuscript techniques.

In April 2022, Doran was reported among the more than three dozen comics creators who contributed to Operation USA's benefit anthology book, Comics for Ukraine: Sunflower Seeds, a project spearheaded by editor Scott Dunbier, whose profits would be donated to relief efforts for Ukrainian refugees resulting from the February 2022 Russian invasion of Ukraine.

Neil Gaiman's Chivalry was listed about the Ten Best Graphic Novels of the Year for 2022 by the Washington Post. Doran's work for Chivalry was the subject of a solo exhibit at the Museum of Cartoon Art in San Francisco California.

In 2023, The Society of Illustrators announced a solo exhibit for Doran's work entitled Colleen Doran Illustrates Neil Gaiman featuring work from Chivalry, Snow, Glass, Apples, Troll Bridge, Sandman, American Gods, and Norse Mythology.

Bibliography

Awards and honors
 2023 Excelsior Award Shortlist Neil Gaiman's Chivalry, The Stan Lee Excelsior Awards  
 2022 Washington Post 10 Best Graphic Novels of the Year: Neil Gaiman's Chivalry 
 2022 Best Graphic Novels for Adults: Neil Gaiman's Chivalry, American Library Association Graphic Novels and Comics Round Table  
 Eisner Award Best Adaptation from Another Medium Winner: Neil Gaiman's Snow, Glass, Apples, Eisner Awards 2020 
 Bram Stoker Award Superior Achievement in a Graphic Novel Winner: Neil Gaiman's Snow, Glass, Apples, Horror Writers Association 2019
 Ringo Award Best Original Graphic Novel Winner: Neil Gaiman's Snow, Glass, Apples, Ringo Awards 2020 
 Eisner Award Best Penciller/Inker Nominee: Neil Gaiman's Snow, Glass, Apples, Eisner Awards 2020 
 Ringo Award Best Artist Nominee: Colleen Doran, Ringo Awards 2020  
 Reuben Award Best Graphic Novel Nominee: Neil Gaiman's Snow, Glass, Apples, National Cartoonists Society 2020
 Tripwire Award Best Original Graphic Novel Nominee: Neil Gaiman's Snow, Glass, Apples, Tripwire Magazine 2020
 Rondo Award Honorable Mention: Neil Gaiman's Snow, Glass, Apples, Rondo Hattan Classic Horror Awards 2019 
 Wizard World Hall of Legends 2017 
 Great Graphic Novels for Teens 2017 Nominee Non-Fiction: Amazing Fantastic Incredible Stan Lee, Stan Lee, Peter David, Colleen Doran, Young Adult Library Services Association 2017  
 The Best American Comics 2013: Gone to Amerikay excerpt, Derek McCulloch and Colleen Doran, Houghton Mifflin 
 Hugo Award Nominee: Chicks Dig Comics, Best Related Work 2013 (Group Nomination) 
 Great Graphic Novels for Teens Fiction: Mangaman 2012, Young Adult Library Services Association 
 Best Adult Books for Teens: Gone to Amerikay, Derek McCulloch and Colleen Doran, School Library Journal 2012 
 Eisner Award Winner: Tori Amos Comic Book Tattoo (anthology) 2009, Best Anthology (Group Award) 
 Harvey Award Winner: Tori Amos Comic Book Tattoo (anthology) 2009, Best Anthology (Group Award) 
 International Horror Guild Award: The Nightmare Factory (anthology) 2008, Best Illustrated Narrative (Group Award) 
 Eisner Award Winner: Best Archival Collection/Project Comic Books, Absolute Sandman ,Vol 1 (Group Award) 
 Women Cartoonist's Hall of Fame, 2007, Friends of Lulu 
 Artist in Residence, Smithsonian Institution May 6–14, 2006 "Capricious Comics", Freer/Sackler Galleries, The Smithsonian Museums of Asian Art
 Comics Buyer's Guide Fan Award Top Ten Nominee: Favorite Penciler, Favorite Inker, Favorite Cover Artist, Favorite Comic Book A Distant Soil 2004  
 Chesley Award Nominee, Monochrome Work Unpublished 2002
 American Library Association 2002 featured speaker
 Gaylactic Spectrum Award Nominee, A Distant Soil, Best Other Work 2001
 Guest of Honor, San Diego Comic Con 1998
 3rd Annual Japan-US Manga Symposium, Tokyo 1996, Tezuka Productions
 Eisner Award Nominee: Sandman, Best Serialized story 1993 (Group Nomination)
 Eisner Award Winner: Sandman, Best Continuing Series 1993 (Group Award)
 Eisner Award Winner: Sandman, Best Continuing Series 1992 (Group Award) 
 Eisner Award Nominee: Sandman: Dream Country, Best Graphic Album Reprint 1992 (Group Nomination) 
 Dori Seda Award Nominee: Most Promising New Female Cartoonist 1988

Notable works

With Neil Gaiman: Adaptations and Related Projects

 American Gods: Volume I (2018) anthology (artist) Dark Horse Comics 
The Complete American Gods (2021) anthology (artist) Dark Horse Comics 
American Gods No. 4 (2017) (artist) Dark Horse Comics (ASIN:B0717B95ZN)
 Chivalry (2022) Dark Horse Comics (graphic novel adaptation and artist 
 The Sandman 
 Sandman Volume III: Dream Country (1991)(2010) DC Comics/Vertigo 
Sandman Volume III: Dream Country 30th Anniversary Edition (2018) DC Comics 
Sandman No. 20 DC Comics/ Vertigo (artist)
Sandman Volume V: A Game of You (1993) DC Comics/Veritgo 
Sandman No. 34 DC Comics/ Vertigo (artist)
 The Absolute Sandman Volume I (2006) DC Comics/Vertigo 
 The Absolute Sandman Volume II (2007) DC Comics/Vertigo 
 Sandman Omnibus Volume 1 (2013) DC Comics/Vertigo 
 Sandman: A Gallery of Dreams (1994) DC Comics/Vertigo (ASIN: B002EAHJN0)
 The Death Gallery (1996) DC Comics/Vertigo
 Sandman 20th Anniversary Poster (2008) 
 Death: Deluxe Edition (2012) DC Comics/Vertigo 
 Absolute Death (2009) DC Comics/Vertigo 
 Snow, Glass, Apples (2019) Dark Horse Comics (graphic novel adaptation and artist) 
 Vertigo Visions: Ten Years on the Edge (2003) Watson Guptill 
 Lucifer No. 62 DC Comics/Vertigo (artist)
 Lucifer: Volume 10: Morningstar (2006) DC Comics/Vertigo  
 Troll Bridge (2016) Dark Horse Comics (graphic novel adaptation and artist) 
 Troll Bridge (1998) Image Comics (short story adaptation and artist) (UNSPSC-Code: 55101500)

Graphic Novels: Original Works, Anthologies, and Compilations

 A Distant Soil graphic novel editions (creator/artist/writer):
 Late-1980s original color editions:
 A Distant Soil: Immigrant Song Donning/Starblaze (1987) 
 A Distant Soil: Knights of the Angel Donning/Whitford Press (1989) 
 1990s and on black and white reprints:
 A Distant Soil: The Gathering Image Comics (1997) compilation of comic issues 1–13 
 A Distant Soil: The Ascendant Image Comics (1998) compilation of comic issues 15–25 
 A Distant Soil: The Aria Image Comics (2001) compilation of comic issues 26–31 
 A Distant Soil: Coda Image Comics (2005) compilation of comic issues 32–38  hardcover, November 2005, 
 2013 and on Digital Remasters and new editions:
 A Distant Soil: The Gathering TPB Volume I Image Comics/Shadowline (2013) digitally remastered compilation of issues 1–13 with new story content  
 A Distant Soil: The Ascendant TPB Volume II Image Comics/Shadowline (2014) digitally remastered compilation of issues 14–25 with new story content  
Amazing Fantastic Incredible Stan Lee (2015) Simon and Schuster graphic novel (artist) 
 Anne Rice's The Master of Rampling Gate: A Graphic Tale of Unspeakable Horror (1991) Innovation graphic novel adaptation (artist) ASIN B00SB53P62
Balmain Dreams: 10 OR (2021) Z2 Comics original graphic novel anthology (artist) 
Balmain Dreams: 10 OR (2021) VIP Tier Limited Edition (limited to 50 copies)
Balmain Dreams: 10 OR (2021) Special Edition Tier (limited to 3 copies)
 The Book of Lost Souls: Introductions All Around (2006) Marvel Comics graphic novel compilation (artist) 
The Book of Lost Souls (2005) Marvel Comics/Icon issue #1–6
 Disney
Walt Disney's Beauty and the Beast: A Tale of Enchantment (1992) Disney Comics
 Disney Adventures
Disney Cartoon Tales: Beauty and the Beast, a Tale of Enchantment (1991) W.D. Publications 
Disney's Beauty and the Beast Junior Graphic Novel (1992) 
Disney Princess Treasury Volume I (2015) Joe Books 
 A Princess Treasury (Step into Reading) (2010) Random House 
Gone to Amerikay (2012) DC Comics/Vertigo HC original graphic novel (artist) 
 Mangaman (2011) Houghton Mifflin original graphic novel (artist) 
 Morrison Hotel: Graphic Novel (2021) Z2 Comics anthology (artist) 
The Nightmare Factory (2007) Harper Paperbacks graphic novel adaptation anthology (artist) 
Orbiter original graphic novel (artist) (2003) DC Comics/Wildstorm HC 
Orbiter(2004) DC Comics/Vertigo TPB 
Ocean/Orbiter Deluxe Edition (2015) DC Comics/Vertigo HC 
Power Pack Classic Omnibus Vol. 2 graphic novel compilation (artist) (2021) Marvel Comics 
 Marvel Fanfare No. 55, (artist) (1990)
Power Pack, Miniseries 1-4, (artist) (2000)
Spider-Man
Amazing Spider-Man Epic Collection: Cosmic Adventures (2013) 
Amazing Spider-Man No. 326 (1989)
Spider-Man: Died In Your Arms Tonight (2009) 
Amazing Spider-Man No. 600 (2009)
Spider-Man: Back In Black hardcover (2007) 
Spider-Man: Back in Black TPB (2008) 
Friendly Neighborhood Spider-Man Annual No. 1 (2007)
Spider-Man: Friendly Neighborhood Spider-Man, The Complete Collection (2017) 
Acts of Vengeance: Spider-Man and the X-Men (2021) 
Tori Amos: Comic Book Tattoo (2008) anthology (artist) Image Comics 
 The Vampire Diaries (2014) DC Comics graphic novel compilation, (writer/artist) 
 The Vampire Diaries #1,3 (writer) No. 6 (writer/artist) (2013) DC Comics 
 Wonder Woman
Wonder Woman by George Perez Vol. 4 (2020) DC Comics graphic novel compilation (artist) 
Wonder Woman No. 45 (1990) DC Comics (artist)
Wonder Woman Annual No. 2 DC Comics
Wonder Woman by George Perez Vol. 5 (2021) DC Comics graphic novel compilation (artist) 
Wonder Woman No. 49 (1990) DC Comics (artist)
Wonder Woman: The Once and Future Story (1998) DC Comics original graphic novel 
Sensational Wonder Woman (2021) DC Comics graphic novel compilation (writer/artist) 
Sensational Wonder Woman No. 5 (2021) DC Comics (writer/artist)

Illustration
 Dead in the West by Joe R. Lansdale (2005) Nightshade Books, 
 Star Wars
Art of Star Wars Galaxy, Vol 2.  (1994) Berkeley Publishing Group, 
Star Wars Galaxy Magazine No. 4
Star Wars Galaxy 4 Trading Cards
Star Wars Galactic Files 2 Trading Cards
Star Wars Clone Wars Trading Cards
Star Wars: Dr Aphra Annual #3, cover artist

Exhibits
 Chivalry: The Art of Colleen Doran, 2022, Cartoon Art Museum, San Francisco, CA 
 The Legend of Wonder Woman, 2021, Cartoon Art Museum, San Francisco, CA 
 Women in Comics, 2021, Palazzo Merulana, Rome, Italy 
 Women in Comics: Looking Forward, Looking Back, 2020, Society of Illustrators, New York, NY
 A Boy and His Tiger: A Tribute to Bill Watterson, 2020, Cartoon Art Museum, San Francisco, CA
 Four Color Images Gallery, New York, NY
 Kunstlerhaus, Stuttgart, Germany
 Porto, Portugal
 Secession Gallery, Vienna, Austria
 Gijon Cultural Center, Gijon, Spain
 San Francisco Cartoon Art Museum, San Francisco, CA
 Museum of Cartoon Art, Rye Brook, New York
 Gallery Nucleus: 20 Years of Sandman 2008
 Gallery Nucleus: A Handful of Dust, 25 Years of Sandman
 Krannert Art Museum; Out of Sequence: Underrepresented Voices in American Comics
 Laboratory of Art and Ideas at Belmar; Out of Sequence

References

External links

 
 

American female comics artists
Female comics writers
Living people
Place of birth missing (living people)
Marvel Comics writers
Marvel Comics people
DC Comics people
Tolkien artists
American comics writers
20th-century American women writers
1964 births